Ramón Ortega y Frías (March 1, 1825 – February 16, 1883) was a Spanish writer.

Works
 El Caballero Relámpago
 Guzmán el Bueno, 1856
 El diablo en palacio, 1882
 Cervantes, 1859–60, 2 vols.
 El Caballero Relámpago, 1853
 Abelardo y Eloísa, 1867
 El alcázar de Madrid, 1857
 La capa del diablo, 1858
 El trovador, 1860
 El tribunal de la sangre, o Los secretos de un rey, 1867
 El siglo de las tinieblas, o Memorias de un inquisidor, 1868
 El ángel de la familia, 1873
 El Cid, 1875
 Los hijos de Satanás, 1876
 El testamento de un conspirador. Memorias de un reo de estado, 1876.
 Las islas maravillosas, o Aventuras del capitán Bristol, 1882 
 La casa de tócame Roque o Un crimen misterioso, 1875
 El secretario del Duque, 1867
 El duende de la Corte, novela histórica, 1862
 La politica y sus misterios ó El libro de Satanás, 1869, 4 vols.

References

Spanish male novelists
1825 births
1883 deaths
People from Granada
19th-century Spanish novelists
19th-century male writers